June Wyndham Davies (born 27 June 1929) is a British television producer and director. For her work as Co-Producer (with Pippa Cross) of the film August starring, and directed by Sir Anthony Hopkins, she won the BAFTA Wales award for Best Drama in 1997. She is also a writer, having written several short stories and plays, including ‘Green Shutters’.

Life
June Wyndham Davies was born in Cardiff in 1929 to Mervyn and Despina Wyndham Davies of Llandaff. Her father served as an officer in WW2, and her mother, eldest daughter of the engineer and inventor James Wyndham, had been a ballet dancer. She attended Elm Tree House convent before moving to London to train at the Royal Academy of Dramatic Art.

Wyndham Davies entered the industry as a BBC Director in 1965, when most television drama was transmitted live from the studio. She directed 30 Minute Theatre, Sunday Afternoon Theatre, and Out of Town Theatre, as well as single plays such as The House Mouse, Why Me? The Heart Grows Cold and The Lariat. She also devised, wrote, and directed the 6-part documentary series Why Would You Believe It? based on the idea of truth often being stranger than fiction.

Going freelance in 1969, Wyndham Davies continued her career with BBC, Anglia, Granada, and Yorkshire Television, directing Boy Meets Girl, Love Story, The Dolly Spike, The Folly, and Don’t Shoot the Cook. She moved into directing episodes for long-running television series and serials, such as Coronation Street, Castle Haven, Kate, Crown Court, and children’s television adaptations of classics, such as Pollyanna (starring Elaine Stritch) and Johanna Spyri’s Heidi (featuring Dame Flora Robson and Kathleen Byron),  which received an EMMY nomination in the United States for best television serial in 1975.

From 1976 onwards, Wyndham Davies worked almost exclusively for Granada Television, producing dark and thought-provoking dramas, often dealing with the supernatural as with the series Shades of Darkness, as well as Victorian crime themes, such as the ground-breaking Sergeant Cribb series with Alan Dobie in the title role.

With a knack for spotting talent, Wyndham Davies gave the young Michael Caine his first chance in theatre, along with early opportunities for Rhys Ifans and Hugh Grant. Her inspired casting ideas whilst working for the Drama department at Granada included the suggestion of the late Jeremy Brett for the part of Sherlock Holmes in The Adventures of Sherlock Holmes. To this day, Brett is still widely considered to have given the definitive portrayal of Conan Doyle’s detective. Wyndham Davies went on to produce the second series: The Return of Sherlock Holmes, as well as The Memoirs of Sherlock Holmes in 1994, and several feature-length television films including: Sherlock Holmes – The Sign of Four, also starring Jenny Seagrove.

Awards
BAFTA Cymru - Best Drama:‘August’ 1997
Chicago International Film Festival – Silver Plaque: ‘The Lady’s Maid’s Bell’ (Shades of Darkness) 1985

Selected filmography

Producer
 Send in the Girls
 The Adventures of Sherlock Holmes
 Cribb

Director
 Crown Court
 Heidi
 Pollyanna

Actress

1963-1964 - Compact (TV Series) -Radiographer / Mrs. Stenton 
1964 - On, Comet! On, Cupid! On, Donner and Blitzen! - Mrs.Stenton 
1963 - Shock Tactics - Radiographer
1963 - On the Edge - Radiographer
1964 - Curtain of Fear (TV Series) Secretary 
1964 - The Linton Compact - Secretary
1958 - Saturday Playhouse (TV Series) - Secretary	to Mrs. Wentross 
1958 – Trespass - Secretary to Mrs. Wentross

Director

1986 - Shades of Darkness (TV Series) (1 episode) 
 Agatha Christie's The Last Seance
1980-1981 - Cribb (TV Series) (3 episodes) 
 Mad Hatter's Holiday (1981) 
 Swing, Swing Together (1980) 
 Waxwork (1980) 
1981 - Christmas Spirits (TV Movie)

1979 - Screenplay (TV Series)

1973-1977 - Crown Court (TV Series) (7 episodes) 
 One for the Road: Part 1 (1977) 
 The Personator: Part 1 (1975) 
 A Case of Murder: Part 1 (1974) 
 Traffic Warden's Daughter: Part 1 (1974) 
 A Message to Ireland: Part 3 (1973) 
1975-1976 - Coronation Street (TV Series) 
 Episode #1.1655 (1976) 
 Episode #1.1481 (1975) 
1974 - Heidi (TV Mini-Series) (6 episodes)

1973 - Pollyanna (TV Mini-Series) (6 episodes)

1970-1972 - Kate (TV Series) 
 Back to Square One (1972) 
 A Nice Rest (1972) 
 Accidents Will Happen (1972) 
 The Woman Behind the Man (1972) 
 I Belong to Somebody (1972) 
1969 - Who-Dun-It (TV Series) (1 episode) 
 Don't Shoot the Cook
1967 - Boy Meets Girl (TV Series) (1 episode) 
 Love with a Few Hairs

Producer
1998 -The Cater Street Hangman (TV Movie)

1996 - August (Film)

1994 -The Memoirs of Sherlock Holmes (TV Mini-Series) (6 episodes) 
 The Cardboard Box (1994) 
 The Mazarin Stone (1994) 
 The Red Circle (1994) 
 The Golden Pince-Nez (1994) 
 The Dying Detective (1994) 
•The Three Gables (1994)
 1992-1993 - The Case-Book of Sherlock Holmes (TV Mini-Series) (producer - 3 episodes) 
 The Eligible Bachelor (1993) 
 The Last Vampyre (1993) 
 The Master Blackmailer (1992) 
1990 - Made in Heaven (TV Series) (producer - 4 episodes) 
 A Fair Mix Up
 The Big Match
 Falling for Love
 Best of Enemies
1989 - The Heat of the Day (TV Movie)

1988 - The Hound of the Baskervilles (TV Movie)

1986-1988 - The Return of Sherlock Holmes (TV Mini-Series) 
 The Bruce Partington Plans (1988)
 Wisteria Lodge (1988)
 Silver Blaze (1988)
 The Devil's Foot (1988)
 The Six Napoleons (1986)
1987 - The Sign of Four (TV Movie)

1987 - The Death of the Heart (TV Movie)

1983-1986 - Shades of Darkness (TV Series) (producer - 9 episodes) 
 Agatha Christie's The Last Seance (1986) (Starring Jeanne Moreau)
 The Demon Lover (1986)
 Bewitched (1983)
 Seaton's Aunt (1983)
 The Maze (1983)
1981 - The Member for Chelsea (TV Series)
 Episode	#1.3
 Episode	#1.2
 Episode	#1.1
1980-1981 - Cribb (TV Series) (producer - 14 episodes) 
 Invitation to a Dynamite Party
 Murder Old Boy? (1981)
 The Choir That Wouldn't Sing (1981)
 The Hand That Rocks the Cradle (1981) 
 The Last Trumpet (1981) 
1981 - Christmas Spirits (TV Movie)

1978 - Send in the Girls (TV Series) (producer - 7 episodes) 
 Goosepimples (1978)
 Chickabiddy (1978)
 Beware the Gentle People (1978)
 Away All Boats (1978)
 A Hardy Breed of Girl (1978)
1966 - Out of Town Theatre (TV Mini-Series) (producer - 1 episode) 
 Why Me? (1966)

References and links

Interview with June Wyndham-Davies

British television producers
British television directors
Living people
British actresses
1929 births
British women television producers
British women television directors